"Baloo Baleerie" is a Scottish lullaby. The title is alliterative nonsense based around the Scots word for lullaby, "baloo". As it is based on a recording in the BBC Glasgow Archives made on 22 January 1949 on the Shetland island of Bressay, it is also known as "The Bressay Lullaby",. 
It  was first published in 1951 by  Alan Lomax.
An English version, "Go Away, Little Fairies" has also been published.

Lyrics
The first verse refers to the story of the changeling, whereby a fairy would secretly substitute its own offspring for an unguarded human baby.  In the first verse, the fairies are told to leave, while in the second verse, guardian angels are asked to protect the child. The third verse advises the child to sleep softly.

See also 
Christian child's prayer § Lullabies

References

Bibliography

External links

 "Baloo Baleerie" Sheet Music
 

Lullabies
Traditional children's songs
Scottish songs
Scots-language works
Scottish nursery rhymes
Songwriter unknown
Year of song missing
Scottish children's songs